Laft-e Kohneh (also Romanized as Lāft-e Kohneh and Laft Kohneh; also known as Lāf Kohneh) is a village in Howmeh Rural District, in the Central District of Qeshm County, Hormozgan Province, Iran. At the 2006 census, its population was 117, in 9 families.

References 

Populated places in Qeshm County